Rat Lake may refer to:
 Rat Lake (Aitkin County, Minnesota)
 Rat Lake (Cottonwood County, Minnesota)